Aatma Gowravam is a 1965 Indian Telugu-language drama film directed by K. Viswanath. It stars Akkineni Nageswara Rao, Kanchana and Rajasree, with music composed by S. Rajeswara Rao. It is produced by D. Madhusudhana Rao under Annapurna Pictures banner.

The film is the directorial debut of Viswanath. It is based on the novel of same name by Yaddanapudi Sulochana Rani, and won two Nandi Awards. The film was screened at the Asian and African film Festival at Tashkent.

Plot 
The film begins on a wealthy couple Zamindar Varahala Rao and his shrew wife Santana Lakshmi who are perturbed as they are childless. Once Zamindar visits the village where he likes his farmer Ramaiah's younger brother Srinivasa Rao / Vasu and wants to adopt him. Here, Ramaiah's mother Shanthamma mentions that she aspires to couple up Vasu with his niece Savitri when Zamindar promises to fulfill her wish. But Santana Lakshmi does not give her acceptance as she desires to adopt her sister's son Venu. Then Zamindar forcibly makes her agree. Soon after the adoption, she breaks up connections between Vasu and his family and sends him to the city for education along with Venu.

Years roll by, Vasu and Venu study at college and in the village, Savitri grows up keeping her entire hopes on Vasu. Once Vasu gets acquainted with Zamindar's close friend Bhaja Govindam and his daughter Geeta. Just after, Geeta falls for Vasu and adults decide to perform their espousal but Vasu does not have such intention. Meanwhile, an awful incident Ramaiah's wife Janaki passes away, madcap Santana Lakshmi not even informs Vasu and he is unable to attend the funeral which woes Ramaiah more.

After some time, Ramaiah reaches Zamindar with the marriage proposal of Vasu and Savitri where he is humiliated by Santana Lakshmi. In that anger, Ramaiah decides to perform a rich alliance for Savitri for which he agrees to marry the bridegroom's mad sister Parvati. Just before the marriage, Savitri leaves the venue to commit suicide, yet, Ramaiah stands for piety and marries Parvati. Being cognizant of the afflict, Vasu immediately rushes to village where he is accused by Ramaiah but later on, realizing the factuality the brothers embrace each other. Parallelly, Savitri is rescued by Geeta who gives her shelter. Right now, the wheel of fortune brings Savitri nearer to Vasu and both of them fall in love without revealing her identity. Knowing it, Geeta blames Savitri for her deceit when Savitri divulges the reality. At present, Geeta makes Vasu perceive the actuality and unites him with Savitri. At last, Vasu, Savitri, Geeta, and Venu play a drama and make elders admit their mistakes. Vasu marries Savitri.

Cast

Music 

Music was composed by S. Rajeswara Rao. Music released on H.M.V. Audio Company.

Accolades 
Nandi Awards - 1965
Third Best Feature Film - Bronze - D. Madhusudhana Rao
Best Story Writer - Gollapudi Maruthi Rao and Yaddanapudi Sulochana Rani

Reception 
Sport and Pastime gave a positive review citing "It has all the elements – a heart-warming story, good acting, pleasing music and conventional cliches – that appeal to the average moviegoer".

References

External links 
 Atma Gowravam film at IMDb.

1965 films
1960s Telugu-language films
Indian black-and-white films
Indian drama films
Films directed by K. Viswanath
Films scored by S. Rajeswara Rao
Films based on novels by Yaddanapudi Sulochana Rani
1965 directorial debut films
Films based on Indian novels
1965 drama films